Andris Poga  (born 29 June 1980, in Riga) is a Latvian orchestral conductor.

Biography
Poga is a graduate of the Jāzeps Vītols Latvian Academy of Music, where he studied trumpet and conducting. He also studied conducting at the University of Music and Performing Arts in Vienna and philosophy at the University of Latvia.

From 2007 to 2010, Poga was artistic director and principal conductor of the Professional Symphonic Band Rīga.  Poga received the Grand Music Award in 2007 in the category Debut of the Year for his concert with the Latvian National Symphony Orchestra.

In 2010, Poga won first prize in the second Evgeny Svetlanov Conducting Competition in Montpellier, France.  From 2011 to 2014, Poga was assistant conductor to Paavo Järvi at Orchestre de Paris.  From 2012 to 2014, he was assistant conductor of the Boston Symphony Orchestra.

Poga became music director of the Latvian National Symphony Orchestra (LNSO) with the 2013-2014 season.  He is scheduled to conclude his chief conductorship of the LNSO at the close of the 2021-2022 season.  In June 2019, the Stavanger Symphony Orchestra announced the appointment of Poga as its next chief conductor, effective with the 2021-2022 season, with an initial contract of 3 seasons.

Poga has made commercial recordings for such labels as Odradek Records, Skani and Myrios Classics.

References

External links
 Official website of Andris Poga
 Orests Silabriedis, "A Conductor of a Clean and Practical Mind. An Interview with Andris Poga".  'Arterritory' blog, 22 July 2013
 Latvian National Symphony Orchestra page on Andris Poga
 Nordic Artists Management agency page on Andris Poga

 

1980 births
Living people
Latvian conductors (music)
Male conductors (music)
Musicians from Riga
21st-century conductors (music)
21st-century male musicians